Single Girl, Married Girl is a folk song made famous by The Carter Family, about the differences in lifestyle between the two title characters. 

The song was originally released on Victor Records in January 1928 as the a-side of Victor 20937, the Carter Family’s second 78-rpm record for the label. It was recorded on August 2, 1927, the second day of their first session with producer and engineer Ralph Peer, and released in January 1928. This version was later included in Harry Smith’s Anthology of American Folk Music, Vol. 3. Notably, the song does not feature A.P. Carter, but is instead a solo by Sara Carter playing autoharp accompanied by her cousin Maybelle Carter playing lead guitar (Maybelle used an inexpensive Stella guitar during the August 1-2, 1927 sessions).

The song was re-recorded during the last months of Sara and A.P. Carter’s marriage, on May 8, 1935, during a 4-day recording session with Ralph Peer. The tempo of this version is much slower, and Sara Carter sings at a much lower pitch. This version was first released on Arc Records, along with the song “No Other’s Bride I’ll Be,” as ARC 8733.

Personnel 

 Sara Carter: Vocals, autoharp
 Maybelle Carter: Guitar
 Ralph Peer: Recording producer/engineer

Notable Versions 

Artist: The Haden Triplets
Album: The Haden Triplets

Artist: Charlie Haden Family and Friends (featuring Petra Haden, Tanya Haden, and Rachel Haden); 
Album: Rambling Boy

Artist: Petra Haden
Album: The Harry Smith Project: Anthology Of American Folk Music Revisited

Artist: Ruby Vass

Artist: Jody Stecher and Kate Brislin
Album: Songs of the Carter Family

Artist: Levon Helm
Album: Dirt Farmer

Artist:  The Kossoy Sisters
Album:  Bowling Green
Heard on:  soundtrack of Obvious Child

Artist: Alex De Grassi
Album: Now And Then: Folk Songs for the 21st Century

Artist: Promise and the Monster
Album: Transparent Knives

Artist: 16 Horsepower
Album: Folklore

Artist: Peter, Paul and Mary
Album: In Concert (Peter, Paul and Mary album)

References

Further reading 
Where Dead Voices Gather: The Anthology of American Folk Music Project blog
The Old, Weird America blog

Carter Family songs
Peter, Paul and Mary songs